Scott is a town in Tramping Lake No. 380, Saskatchewan, Canada. The population was 74 at the 2021 Canada Census. The town is located south of the junction of Highway 14 and Highway 374, approximately 10 km west of the Town of Wilkie. Scott was known as Saskatchewan's smallest town, but is now second smallest to Fleming.

Demographics 

Attractions 
 Scott Experimental Farm
 Scott Rock

Climate

Scott experiences a Humid continental climate, with long, extremely cold winters and warm summers.

See also 

 List of communities in Saskatchewan
 List of towns in Saskatchewan

References 

Tramping Lake No. 380, Saskatchewan
Towns in Saskatchewan
Division No. 13, Saskatchewan